Scoparia tohokuensis is a moth in the family Crambidae. It was described by Inoue in 1982. It is found in China (Fujian, Guizhou, Hubei, Sichuan, Zhejiang), Japan and Russia.

References

Moths described in 1982
Scorparia